The Tecnam P-Jet is an Italian light turbofan aircraft in development by Tecnam.

Design and development
The P-Jet, under development to be used as a light military trainer or reconnaissance aircraft, is a side-by-side single engine turbofan aircraft with retractable tricycle landing gear and a twin rudder arrangement.

Specifications (P-Jet)

References

External links
 Technam P-Jet

Tecnam aircraft
Proposed aircraft of Italy